N. baileyi may refer to:

Naemorhedus baileyi or red goral, a species of even-toed ungulate
Notropsis baileyi or red Shiner, a species of freshwater fish
Noturus baileyi or smoky madtom, a species of catfish

See also
Baileyi (disambiguation)